Gravedancer or Gravedancers may refer to:

 "Gravedancer", a song by Velvet Revolver from the album Libertad 
 The Gravedancers, a 2006 American horror film
 Grave Dancers Union, a 1992 album by Soul Asylum
 "The Grave Dancer", a song from the album 25 to Live by Grave Digger
 "Gravedancer", a song from the 2004 album Terrifyer by Pig Destroyer

See also
 "Gravedancing", an episode of Caprica